Choi Uk Tsuen or Tsoi Uk Tsuen is a village in Yuen Long Kau Hui, New Territories, Hong Kong.

Administration
Choi Uk Tsuen is a recognized village under the New Territories Small House Policy. For electoral purposes, Choi Uk Tsuen is located in the Shap Pat Heung North constituency of the Yuen Long District Council. It is currently represented by Shum Ho-kit, who was elected in the 2019 elections.

Features
The village has an ancestral hall which houses photos of the living and deceased people of the village. The village also has a community centre.

Culture
The community living in Choi Uk Tsuen consists of people who have the surname Choi, specifically descendants of three independent family lines who share the same name and have joined the village at various times.

The traditional Poon Choi (Big Bowl Feast) still continues when there is a major event taking place (e.g. wedding celebration and various Chinese Festivals according to the Chinese New year).

Representation
Villagers have to decide who they want to represent the village. The villagers decide through the electoral selection.

Choi Uk Tsuen is part of the Tung Tau alliance or "Joint Meeting Group of Seven Villages", together with Nam Pin Wai, Tung Tau Tsuen, Ying Lung Wai, Shan Pui Tsuen, Wong Uk Tsuen and Tai Wai Tsuen. The Yi Shing Temple in Wong Uk Tsuen is an alliance temple of the Tung Tau Alliance.

References

External links

 Delineation of area of existing village Choi Uk Tsuen (Shap Pat Heung) for election of resident representative (2019 to 2022)
 Results of 2007 Village Representative Elections

Villages in Yuen Long District, Hong Kong
Shap Pat Heung
Yuen Long